Halligan is a surname of Irish origin, deriving from Irish Ó hAilechain or Ó hAleagain. Bearers include:

John Halligan (born 1955), Irish politician
Bob Halligan, Jr. (born 1953), US Christian rock musician
Brendan Halligan (1936–2020), Irish economist and politician
Brian Halligan, CEO of HubSpot
Caitlin Halligan (born 1966), US lawyer and judicial nominee
Danny Halligan (born 1965), New Zealand soccer player
Daryl Halligan (born 1966), New Zealand rugby league player
Dick Halligan (born 1943), US jazz-rock musician
James Halligan (1778–1806), an Irishman hanged for murder in America
James Reginald Halligan (1894–1968), Australian public servant
Jim Halligan (1936-2022), US politician
Jocko Halligan (1868–1945), US baseball player
John Halligan (ice hockey) (1941–2010), US ice hockey executive
John Halligan, Jr. (1876–1934), US Navy admiral
Johnny Halligan (1899–1977), Scottish footballer
Liam Halligan (born 1969), UK economist and journalist
Marion Halligan (born 1940), Australian writer
Ray Halligan (born 1939), Australian politician
Ryan Halligan (1989–2003), American student who committed suicide after being bullied
Ursula Halligan, Irish broadcaster
William Halligan (actor) (1883–1957), American stage and film actor
William ("Billy") Halligan (1886–1950), Irish professional association football player 
William J. Halligan (1898–1992), founder of Hallicrafters

See also

Suicide of Ryan Halligan
Senator Halligan (disambiguation)

Irish families
Surnames of Irish origin
Anglicised Irish-language surnames